Yeshe Walmo is a deity of the Bon religion.

Yeshe Walmo is considered the wisdom aspect of Sipe Gyalmo. Throughout the ages, whenever the Bon religion suffered persecution, lamas would hide Bon texts and sacred ritual objects in mountains. Yeshe Walmo is the deity in charge of keeping Bon texts and sacred items safe. She is the preserver and protector of all Bon wisdom and allows these objects to be found when times are ripen. These hidden objects are known as "terma" and the finder, usually a dakini, is known as a "terton". Dakinis, feminine spirit beings, often manifest in human form. There are many stories of termas being discovered by tertöns in Tibet even in this modern day.

Yeshe Walmo is in the same color as Sipe Gyalmo, but has only one face and two arms. She stands on one foot dressed in peacock feathers, which symbolize the transmutation of poison (ignorance). In her right hand, she holds a flaming thunderbolt sword, which cuts away ignorance. Her left hand holds a vase filled with the waters of long life. She wears a tiger skin, which displays her prowess over the most ferocious energies of nature. She stands upon a lotus flower representing the purity of her wisdom and is surrounded by flames burning all ignorance.

Yeshe Walmo works swiftly when called upon for any assistance (health problems, business problems, life problems, etc.) and is an especially good aide to students and scholars.

External links
Yeshe Walmo at Himilayan art.org

Bon deities